Konstantinos D. Tsatsos (July 1, 1899 – October 8, 1987) was a Greek diplomat, professor of law, scholar and politician. He served as the second President of the Third Hellenic Republic from 1975 to 1980.

Life 
He was born in Athens in 1899. After graduating from the Law School of the National and Kapodistrian University of Athens in 1918 he joined the diplomatic corps. After completing his doctoral studies (1924–1928) in Heidelberg, Weimar Republic Germany, he returned to Greece where he became a professor of law in 1933. In 1940, he was arrested and exiled for opposing the 4th of August Regime under Prime Minister of Greece Ioannis Metaxas. During the Axis occupation of Greece during World War II, Tsatsos participated in the Greek Resistance and then he fled to the Middle East, where the exiled Greek government was seated.

After the end of World War II, in 1945 he returned to Greece and entered politics and became minister for the first time, serving as Interior Minister in the first cabinet of Vice Admiral Petros Voulgaris (8 April – 11 August 1945). In 1946, when he decided to participate more actively in the politics of Greece, he resigned from his post National and Kapodistrian University of Athens and then he became a member of the Liberal Party. After the formation of the National Radical Union by Constantine Karamanlis, in 1955 he became a member of the party and one of the closest colleagues of Karamanlis, although, ideologically, he was a centrist-liberal and not a conservative.

He served as a member of parliament and in various ministerial positions until the Greek military junta of 1967–1974. Under the first premiership of Karamanlis (1955–1963) he served for many years as Minister of Public Administration. After the Metapolitefsi in 1974, he was elected again as a member of the Hellenic Parliament and became Minister for Culture. In 1975, he was elected President of the Republic by the parliament. He retired after serving his five-year term. He died in 1987 in Athens.  He is buried in the First Cemetery.  He was survived by his wife, Ioanna née Seferiádou, the sister of the Nobel laureate poet George Seferis who died in 2000.

Tsatsos as a scholar 
Konstantinos Tsatsos served as professor of the philosophy of law from 1933 until 1946 when he entered politics. 
Since 1962 he was a member of the Academy of Athens. His vast writing work includes textbooks of legal theory, surveys on philosophy and history, as well as literary works, poems, essays and translations of ancient Greek and Roman classics. In 1974, he presided over the parliamentary commission that submitted the first draft of the new constitution.

Writings on legal theory 

 Der Begriff des positiven Rechts, Heidelberg: Weiss'sche Universitäts-Buchhandlung, 1928
 The Problem of the Interpretation of Law, Athens: Sakkoulas, 1978 (in Greek)
 The problem of the Sources of Law, Athens: Papadogiannis, 1941 (in Greek)
 Introduction to Legal Science, Athens: Papazisis, 1945 (in Greek)
 Studies on the Philosophy of Law, Athens: Ikarosa, 1960 (in Greek)
 "Society and the Law", in Archive of Philosophy and Positive Sciences (1935) (in Greek)
 "Le Droit et la société", in Droit, Morale, Moeurs, IIe Annuaire de l'Institut International de Philosophie du Droit et de Sociologie Juridique, Paris, 1936
 "Contract as Legal Rule", in volume for K. Triantafillopoulos, Athens, 1959 (in Greek)
 "Qu'est-ce-que la philosophie du droit?", in: Archives de Philosophie du Droit 7 (1962)

Surveys on history and philosophy (translations) 
 The Social Philosophy of Ancient Greeks, Athens: Estia, 1962 (in Greek)
 Cicero, Athens: Estia, 1968 (in Greek)
 Demosthenes, Athens: Estia, 1975 (in Greek)

Essays 
 The Greek Course, Athens: Estia, 1967
 Anathemas and meditations, 4 Volumes, Athens: Estia, 1983–1991 (in Greek)
 The Modern World, Athens: Editions of the Friends, 1992 (in Greek)

Literary writings 
 Palamas, Athens: Estia, 1966 (in Greek)
 A Dialogue about poetry - A dialogue with Giorgos Seferis, Athens: Estia, 1975 (in Greek)

References

External links 
  Official Biography

|-

1899 births
1987 deaths
20th-century Greek philosophers
20th-century presidents of Greece
Burials at the First Cemetery of Athens
Culture ministers
Deaths from cancer in Greece
Greek educators
Greek MPs 1956–1958
Greek political writers
Health ministers of Greece
Justice ministers of Greece
Liberal Party (Greece) politicians
Members of the Academy of Athens (modern)
Member of the Academy of the Kingdom of Morocco
Ministers of National Education and Religious Affairs of Greece
Ministers of the Interior of Greece
Ministers of Tourism of Greece
Academic staff of the National and Kapodistrian University of Athens
National Radical Union politicians
New Democracy (Greece) politicians
Diplomats from Athens
Presidents of Greece
Culture ministers of Greece
Grand Crosses with Star and Sash of the Order of Merit of the Federal Republic of Germany
Politicians from Athens